"1, 2, 3" is a song by Mexican singer Sofía Reyes featuring American singers Jason Derulo and De La Ghetto. It was released as a single on February 16, 2018. The song was written by Reyes, Derulo, Ghetto, Nicole Zignago, Ricardo Montaner, Jon Leone and Charlie Guerrero.

Background
While talking about the song, Sofía Reyes said;

Music video
The music video for the song, directed by Mike Ho, was shot in Los Angeles. It premiered via Reyes' YouTube channel on February 16, 2018 and received a nomination for a Lo Nuestro Award for Video of the Year.

Charts

Weekly charts

Monthly charts

Year-end charts

Certifications

Release history

See also
List of Airplay 100 number ones of the 2010s
List of number-one songs of 2018 (Bolivia)

References

2018 singles
2018 songs
2022 singles
2022 songs
Sofía Reyes songs
Warner Music Latina singles
Jason Derulo songs
Songs written by Jason Derulo
Number-one singles in Romania
Songs written by Ricardo Montaner